Ardley End is a hamlet in the Uttlesford area of Essex, England.  It is approximately half a mile from the village of Hatfield Heath.

Uttlesford
Hamlets in Essex